Arkadiy may refer to:

Arkadiy Abramovich (born 1993), heir to Roman Abramovich, Russian billionaire and owner of Chelsea F.C. Biography
Arkadiy Akopyan (born 1984), Russian professional footballer, currently playing for FC Dynamo Bryansk
Arkadiy Alov (1914–1982), Soviet Russian football player, coach and referee
Arkadiy Babchenko (born 1977), Russian print and television journalist
Arkadiy Belinkov (1921–1970), Russian writer and literary critic
Arkadiy Bondarenko (born 1996), Russian football player
Arkadiy Chernyshev (1914–1992), Soviet ice hockey and soccer player
Arkadiy Holovchenko (born 1936), Ukrainian former swimmer
Arkadiy Imrekov (born 1985), Russian professional football manager and a former player
Arkadiy Kiselyov (1880–1938), politician of the Ukrainian Soviet Socialist Republic, and Prosecutor General from 1935 to 1936
Arkadiy Krasavin (born 1967), Russian professional football coach and a former player
Arkadiy Lobzin (born 1997), Russian football player
Arkadiy Malisov (born 1967), retired Georgian professional football player
Arkadiy Migdal (1911–1991), Soviet physicist and member of the USSR Academy of Sciences
Arkadiy Ivanovich Morkov (1747–1827), Russian noble (count) and diplomat
Arkadiy Pogodin (1901–1975), Soviet singer who worked in variety theater and operetta
Arkadiy Semyonov (born 1959), Russian poet, founder of group Vezhliviy Otkaz
Arkadiy Sergeev (born 1986), Russian former competitive ice dancer
Arkadiy Dmitrievich Shvetsov (1892–1953), Soviet aircraft engine designer
Arkadiy Simanov (born 1992), Russian professional association football player
Arkadiy Ismailovich Sukhorukov, professor and expert on economic security issues
Arkadiy Tumanyan (born 1998), professional Armenian and Ukrainian football midfielder
Arkadiy Tyapkin (born 1895), association football player
Arkadiy Vaksberg (1927–2011), Soviet and Russian investigative journalist, writer on historical subjects, film maker and playwright
Arkadiy Vasilyev (born 1987), Russian decathlete

See also
Arkadi
Arkady

Russian masculine given names